Bryan P. Radliff is a United States Air Force major general who has served as the Commander of the Tenth Air Force since June 4, 2021. Previously, he was the Mobilization Assistant to the Commander of the First Air Force from August 2018 to June 2021.

References

External links

Year of birth missing (living people)
Living people
Place of birth missing (living people)
United States Air Force generals